Proto-Palaungic is the reconstructed proto-language of the Palaungic languages of mainland Southeast Asia.

Homeland
Paul Sidwell (2015) suggests that the Urheimat (homeland) of Proto-Palaungic was in what is now the border region of Laos and Sipsongpanna in Yunnan, China. The Khmuic homeland was adjacent to the Palaungic homeland, resulting in many lexical borrowings among the two branches due to intense contact. Sidwell (2014) suggests that the word for 'water' (Proto-Palaungic *ʔoːm), which Gérard Diffloth had used as one of the defining lexical innovations for his Northern Mon-Khmer branch, was likely borrowed from Palaungic into Khmuic.

Reconstructed forms
The following list of Proto-Palaungic reconstructions, organized by semantic category, is from Sidwell (2015: 100-111).

Personal pronouns

Demonstratives
 *nɔʔ ‘this (prox.)’
 *neʔ ‘this’
 *tVj ‘that (dist.)’

Numerals

Cereal cultivation

Agriculture and village economy

Fruits and plant products

Domesticated animals

Invertebrates

Housing and infrastructure

Lexical similarities with Khmuic
Sidwell (2015) notes that Palaungic and Khmuic share many lexical items, but considers this phenomenon to be a result of lexical diffusion due to intense language contact. Sidwell (2015:112-113) lists the following Proto-Palaungic forms as having diffused from Palaungic into Khmuic.
Palaungic > Khmuic lexical forms
 *ʔɔːt ‘wipe’
 *ʔiɛk ‘armpit’
 *ɓɤs ‘carry on head/back’
 *bliɛs ‘spear’
 *cəˀŋam ‘clear, clean’
 *criːl ‘gold’
 *gɔːʔ ‘friend; relative’
 *kərɗi(ː)ŋ ‘navel’
 *kɤːŋ ‘to dig’
 *kʋɤj ‘above, upper part’
 *laj ‘to trade’
 *mɔk ‘to fell’
 *(ʰ)ɲɤk ‘sticky’
 *tjaːk ‘sambar deer’

Sidwell (2015:113) lists the following Proto-Palaungic forms as having diffused from Khmuic into Palaungic.
Khmuic > Palaungic lexical forms
 *ɟɤːl ‘light in weight’
 *kla(ː)w ‘testicles’

Sidwell (2015:114) lists the following Proto-Palaungic forms that are also shared with Khmuic but not with other Austroasiatic branches, and is unsure of whether they diffused from Palaungic to Khmuic or vice versa.
 *-daːk ‘palm, sole’
 *-jaːŋ ‘female’
 *kəlɔːŋ ‘seed’
 *krlaːŋ ‘planet’
 *-nuːs ‘mouth’
 *tɤːʔ ‘smoke’
 *sŋɔːʔ ‘paddy rice’

See also
Proto-Palaungic reconstructions (Wiktionary)
Proto-Austroasiatic language

References

Sidwell, Paul and Felix Rau (2015). "Austroasiatic Comparative-Historical Reconstruction: An Overview." In Jenny, Mathias and Paul Sidwell, eds (2015). The Handbook of Austroasiatic Languages. Leiden: Brill.
Sidwell, Paul. Proto Palaungic phonology: reconstructing vowel lengths and qualities in a partially restructured system.
 Shorto, Harry L. Sidwell, Paul, Doug Cooper and Christian Bauer, eds. 2006. A Mon–Khmer Comparative Dictionary. Canberra: Australian National University. Pacific Linguistics. .

Palaungic languages
Palaungic